Dembakwi "Boxi" Yomba (born September 4, 1996) is a professional soccer player. Born in Sierra Leone, he has represented the United States at youth level.

Career 
Yomba signed with Spanish club Atlético Madrid in 2014, before returning to the United States to join United Soccer League club Orlando City B on January 13, 2016. He failed to make a first-team appearance during his time at Orlando, and was released by the club at the end of the 2016 season.

On March 14, 2017, Yomba signed with United Soccer League club Reno 1868. He scored his first goal for the team against OSA FC on May 17 during the second round of the 2017 U.S. Open Cup. Yomba was one of five Reno players called up by the team's Major League Soccer affiliate, the San Jose Earthquakes, for its July 14 friendly against Eintracht Frankfurt, and he substituted in for Chris Wondolowski in the 33rd minute of the 4–1 victory before being substituted out again in the 63rd minute for Valeri Qazaishvili.

Yomba and Reno mutually parted ways on June 23, 2018.

Yomba joined Oakland Roots on July 5, 2019.

In January 2020, Yomba moved to Albanian Kategoria Superiore side Laçi. He left the club again at the end of the season.

On February 28, 2022, Yomba signed with MLS Next Pro side Sporting Kansas City II.

References

External links

1996 births
Living people
American soccer players
American expatriate soccer players
American people of Sierra Leonean descent
Atlético Madrid footballers
Orlando City B players
Reno 1868 FC players
Oakland Roots SC players
KF Laçi players
Sporting Kansas City II players
Association football forwards
Soccer players from Georgia (U.S. state)
Sportspeople from Freetown
USL Championship players
National Independent Soccer Association players
MLS Next Pro players
American expatriate sportspeople in Spain
American expatriate sportspeople in the Czech Republic
American expatriate sportspeople in Albania
Expatriate footballers in Spain
Expatriate footballers in the Czech Republic
Expatriate footballers in Albania